The 2013 Indiana Hoosiers men's soccer team was the college's 41st season playing organized men's college soccer.

Background 
In the 2012 regular season Indiana finished 4th in the conference, losing in the Big Ten Tournament to eventual champions Michigan State. Indiana also entered the NCAA Tournament, defeating the Georgetown Hoyas in the 2012 College Cup Final 1–0 and winning the national championship.

Roster

Competitions

Preseason

Regular season

Big Ten Tournament

NCAA Tournament

See also 
 2013 Big Ten Conference men's soccer season
 2013 Big Ten Conference Men's Soccer Tournament
 2013 NCAA Division I Men's Soccer Championship

References 

Indiana Hoosiers
Indiana Hoosiers men's soccer seasons
Indiana Hoosiers
Indiana Hoosiers
Indiana Hoosiers
Big Ten Conference men's soccer champion seasons